The following is a list of PowerPC processors.

General-purpose PowerPC processors

IBM/Motorola

PowerPC 600 family 
 601 50 and 66 MHz
 602 consumer products (multiplexed data/address bus)
 603/603e/603ev notebooks, embedded devices
 604/604e/604ev workstations and low end servers
 620 the first 64-bit implementation

PowerPC 7xx family 
 740/750 (1997) 233–366 MHz

Motorola/Freescale

PowerPC 7xx family 
 PowerPC 740 and 750, 233–366 MHz
 745/755, 300–466 MHz

PowerPC 74xx family 
 7400/7410 350–550 MHz, uses AltiVec, a SIMD extension of the original PPC specs
 7440/7450 micro-architecture family up to 1.5 GHz and 256 kB on-chip L2 cache and improved Altivec
 7447/7457 micro-architecture family up to 1.83 GHz with 512 kB on-chip L2 cache
 7448 micro-architecture family (2.0 GHz) in 90 nm with 1MB L2 cache and slightly improved AltiVec (out of order instructions).
8640/8641/8640D/8641D with one or two e600 cores, 1MB L2 cache

IBM

IBM Power microprocessors 
 POWER3, 64-bit, 200–450 MHz (as POWER3-II), originally the PowerPC 630. Introduced in 1998.
 POWER4, 64-bit, dual core, 1.0–1.9 GHz (as POWER4+), follows the PowerPC 2.00 ISA. Introduced in 2001.
 POWER5, 64-bit, dual core, 2 way SMT/core, 1.6–2.0 GHz, follows the PowerPC 2.01 ISA. Introduced in 2004.
 POWER5+, 64-bit, dual core, 2 way SMT/core, 1.9–2.2 GHz, follows the PowerPC 2.02 ISA. Introduced in 2005.
 POWER6, 64-bit, dual core, 2 way SMT/core, 3.6–4.7 GHz, follows the Power ISA 2.03. Introduced in 2007.
 POWER6+, 64 bit, dual core, 2 way SMT/core, 5.0 GHz, follows the Power ISA 2.05. Introduced in 2009.
 POWER7, 64-bit octo core, 4 way SMT/core, 2.4–4.25 GHz, follows the Power ISA 2.06. Introduced in 2010.
 POWER7+, 64-bit octo core, 4 way SMT/core, 3.0–5.0 GHz, follows the Power ISA 2.06. Introduced in 2012.
 POWER8, 64-bit, hex or twelve core, 8 way SMT/core, 5.0 GHz, follows the Power ISA 2.07. Introduced in 2014.
 POWER9, 64-bit, PowerNV 24 cores of 4 way SMT/core, PowerVM 12 cores of 8 way SMT/core, follows the Power ISA 3.0. Introduced in 2016.
 Power10, 64-bit, 15 SMT8 or 30 SMT4 cores, will follow the Power ISA 3.1. Introduced in 2021.

RS64 
 A10 (Cobra), 50–77 MHz, 1995, single chip processor for Series i
 A25/30 (Muskie), 125–154 MHz, 1996, multi chip, 4 way SMP for Series i
 RS64 (Apache), 64-bit, 125 MHz, 1997 for large scale SMP systems Series i and Series p
 RS64-II (Northstar),  262 MHz, 1998
 RS64-III (Pulsar, Istar),  450 MHz in 1999, 600 in 2000
 RS64-IV (Sstar), 750 MHz, multithreading, 2000

PowerPC 7xx family 
 750CL with 256 kB on die L2 cache at 400–900 MHz introduced in 2006
 750CX/CXe with 256 kB on die L2 cache at 350–600 MHz
 750FX with 512 kB L2 cache announced by IBM in 2001 and available early 2002 at 1 GHz
 750GX with 1 MB L2 cache introduced by IBM in 2003

PowerPC 970 family 
 970 (2003), 64-bit, derived from POWER4, enhanced with VMX, 512 kB L2 cache, 1.4–2 GHz
 970FX (2004), manufactured at 90 nm, 1.8–2.7 GHz
 970GX (2006), manufactured at 90 nm, 1MB L2 cache/core, 1.2–2.5 GHz
 970MP (2005), dual core, 1 MB L2 cache/core, 1.6–2.5 GHz

Cell 
 Cell BE, 64-bit PPE-core, 2 way multithreading, VMX, 512 kB L2 cache, 8x SPE, 8x 256 kB Local Store memory, 3.2 GHz, follows the PowerPC 2.02 ISA
 Cell BE 65 nm, same as above but manufactured on a 65 nm process
 PowerXCell 8i, same as above but with enhanced double precision SPEs and support for DDR-RAM

Supercomputer 
 Blue Gene/L, dual core PowerPC 440, 700 MHz, 2004
 Blue Gene/P, quad core PowerPC 450, 850 MHz, 2007
 Blue Gene/Q, 18 core PowerPC A2, 1.6 GHz, 2011

Other 
 Exponential Technology x704, a BiCMOS PowerPC implementation, 410 to 533 MHz
 P.A. Semi PWRficient PA6T-1682M, a dual-core microprocessor that runs at 2 GHz

Embedded PowerPC 

32-bit and 64-bit PowerPC processors have been a favorite of embedded computer designers. To keep costs low on high-volume competitive products, the CPU core is usually bundled into a system-on-chip (SOC) integrated circuit. SOCs contain the processor core, cache and the processor's local data on-chip, along with clocking, timers, memory (SDRAM), peripheral (network, serial I/O), and bus (PCI, PCI-X, ROM/Flash bus, I2C) controllers. IBM also offers an open bus architecture (called CoreConnect) to facilitate connection of the processor core to memory and peripherals in a SOC design.  IBM and Motorola have competed along parallel development lines in overlapping markets. A later development was the Book E PowerPC Specification, implemented by both IBM and Freescale Semiconductor, which defines embedded extensions to the PowerPC programming model.

AMCC
 440SP: 533–667 MHz, 10/100/1G Ethernet, (2) 64bit PCI-X, 32bit PCI-X, XOR engine, 32k L1 Cache.
 440SPe: 533–667 MHz, 10/100/1G Ethernet, (3) 64bit PCI-Express, 64bit PCI-X, XOR engine, 32k L1 Cache.
 440EPx: 333–667 MHz, (2) 10/100/1G Ethernet, Hardware Security, PCI, DDR-II, FPU, USB 1.1 or USB 2.0, 32k L1 Cache.
 440GR: 333–667 MHz, (2) 10/100 Ethernet, (4) UART, (2) IIC, 53 GPIO, SPI, 32k L1 Cache.
 440GRx: 333–667 MHz, (2) 10/100/1G Ethernet, (4) UART, (2) IIC, 53 GPIO, SPI, DDR-II, Hardware Security, 32k L1 Cache.
 PowerPC Titan, 32-bit, dual core, 2 GHz. Announced, planned release in 2008

Broad Reach Engineering
 BRE440 radiation hardened CPU based on PowerPC 440 core with 256 kB L2 Cache, PCI, (2) 10/100 Ethernet, 4-CH DMA, (2) UART, extensive on chip memory control. Designed specifically for radiation environments and extreme temperature environments (such as space).

BAE Systems
 RAD750 radiation hardened CPU based on PowerPC 750 core.

Culturecom
 V-Dragon based on PowerPC 405 core.

Cray 
 SeaStar, SeaStar2 and SeaStar2+, PowerPC 440 based communications processors for their Opteron based XT3, XT4 and XT5 supercomputers.

Freescale (former Motorola)
 MPC8xx PowerQUICC – networking & telecom card controllers with embedded communications module, up to 80 MHz
 MPC5xx – automotive & industrial controllers
 MPC51xx/MPC52xx – e300 core, automotive & industrial system on a chip (SoC) controllers, up to 466 MHz
 MPC55xx – e200 core, automotive & industrial controllers, up to 144 MHz
 MPC56xx – e200 core, automotive & industrial controllers, up to 264 MHz
 MPC82xx PowerQUICC II – 603e core, networking & telecom SoC controllers with high-capacity on-chip switched bus and communications module, up to 450 MHz
 MPC83xx PowerQUICC II Pro – e300 core, networking & telecom SoC controllers with high-capacity on-chip switched bus and communications module, up to 667 MHz
 MPC85xx PowerQUICC III – e500 core, high end networking & telecom SoC controllers with high-capacity on-chip switched bus and communications module. D Dual core versions supporting both symmetric and asymmetric multiprocessing, up to 1.5 GHz.
 MPC864x – e600 core, 1 MB L2 cache, improved AltiVec (out of order instructions), an embedded memory controller, Ethernet controllers, a RapidIO fabric interface, a PCI Express interface, and MPX bus. Dual core versions supporting both symmetric and asymmetric multiprocessing, up to 1.5 GHz.
 QorIQ Processing Platforms (evolution of the PowerQUICC). The first letter of the model indicates the series, the second and the third model number indicates the number of cores (e.g. P5040 has four cores, T4240 has 24 cores)
 P series
 P1 series, e500v2 cores: P1011, P1020
 P2 series: e500v2 core P2020, e500mc cores P2040, P2041
 P3 series, introduced in 2010, based on e500mc cores: P3041
 P4 series, introduced in 2009, based on e500mc cores: P4080
 P5 series, introduced in 2012, 45 nm process, based on e5500 cores: P5010, P5020, P5021, P5040
 T series, introduced in 2013, all based on e6500 cores, and 28 nm process
 T1 series: T1040, T1042, T1020, T1022
 T2 series: T2080, T2081
 T4 series: T4240, T4160, T4080

IBM (now from AMCC)
 401
 403: MMU added in most advanced version 403GCX
 405: MMU, Ethernet, serial, PCI, SRAM, SDRAM; NPe405 adds more network devices
 440: A range of processors based on the Book E core.
 440EP: 333–667 MHz, (2) 10/100 Ethernet, PCI, DDR, FPU, USB 1.1 or USB 2.0, 32k L1 Cache.
 440GP: 400–500 MHz, (2) 10/100 Ethernet, PCI-X, DDR, 32k L1 Cache.
 440GX: 533–800 MHz, (2) 10/100 Ethernet, (2) 10/100/1G Ethernet with TCP/IP hardware acceleration, PCI-X, DDR, 32k L1 Cache

Microsoft
Xenon (Microsoft Xbox 360) – Three core PPE-based, 1 MB shared L2 cache, VMX128, 3.2 GHz

Nintendo
Gekko (GameCube) – 750CXe core with special enhancements, 486 MHz
Broadway (Wii) – 750CL, 729 MHz
Espresso (Wii U) – 3 × 750 cores, 1.24 GHz

P.A. Semi 
 PWRficient PA6T-1682M: a dual core PPC running at 2 GHz

Rapport 

Kilocore 1025: a CPU with a single PowerPC core and 1024 processing element (8 bit, 125 MHz) cores (unreleased). This CPU is designed for running security and multimedia applications (with parallel processing) on portable game devices and media players.

Xilinx 
 Some Virtex-II Pro and Virtex-4 FPGA have up to two embedded PowerPC 405 cores,.
 Virtex-5 FXT has up to two embedded PowerPC 440 cores.

Northbridge
Northbridge or host bridge for PowerPC CPU is an Integrated Circuit (IC) for interfacing PowerPC CPU with memory, and Southbridge IC. Some Northbridge also provide interface for Accelerated Graphics Ports (AGP) bus, Peripheral Component Interconnect (PCI), PCI-X, PCI Express, or Hypertransport bus. Specific Northbridge IC must be used for PowerPC CPU. It is impossible to use Northbridge for Intel or AMD x86 CPU with PowerPC CPU. However it is possible to use certain types of x86 Southbridge in PowerPC based motherboards. Example: VIA 686B and AMD Geode CS5536.

List of Northbridge for PowerPC:
IBM:
CPC 700 and CPC 710 for IBM PowerPC 750 series.
CPC 925 and CPC 945 for IBM PowerPC 970 series.
Motorola (now available from Tundra):
MPC-105
MPC-106
MPC-107
Mentor Arc Inc. (MAI).
Articia S.
Marvell Discovery series for Motorola MPC74xx and MPC75x and IBM 750 series CPU.
Discovery ( GT-64260A, GT-64261A and GT-64262A).
Discovery LT (MV64420 and MV64430).
Discovery II (MV64360, MV6361 and MV6362).
Discovery III (MV64460, MV6461 and MV6462).
Discovery V (MV 64560).
Discovery VI(MV 64660).
Philips Semiconductor
VAS96011 and VAS96012: Two IC northbridge for PowerPC 603 and PowerPC 604.
Tundra (Canada)
TSI-106 (formerly Motorola MPC-106).
TSI-107 (formerly Motorola MPC-107) / XPC107APX series.
TSI-108
TSI-109
TSI-110
Qspan II – PCI bus interface for PowerPC CPU.
PowerPro (CA91L750) – Memory controller for PowerPC CPU.

See also
PowerPC applications
Power ISA

References

[[Category:Lists of microprocessors|P]